Croxton is a section of Jersey City in the New Jersey Meadowlands in Hudson County, New Jersey, United States.

It is bounded by Secaucus at Penhorn Creek (named for the 17th century American colonial judge and President of the New Jersey Provincial Council and Commander-in-Chief of New Jersey, William Pinhorne). The Riverbend of the Hackensack River and the Hudson Generating Station and the Marion Section lie to the south and Truck 1-9 and Western Slope to the east. Nearby North Bergen Yard and Croxton Yard are parts of the North Jersey Shared Assets Area. The Yard is officially known as the North Jersey Intermodal Terminal.

The area is informally named Croxton after Croxton Yard on the Norfolk Southern Freight Line. Much of the area is filled with New Jersey Transit commuter lines and freight lines. There are no passenger stations although Secaucus Junction is nearby. The area is home to the Metropolitan Bulk Mail Facility for New York and New Jersey. The only major road crossing the district is County Road, which connects Jersey City Heights with Secaucus. In 2005, the New Jersey Turnpike opened Exit 15X to allow access to the newly built Secaucus Junction train station, the access road to which acts like a huge U-turn, and dominates the landscape.

The name Croxton was given to the railroad yard after Philip Croxton, the traffic manager for Lorillard Tobacco Company, which opened a factory at 888 Newark Avenue in the nearby Marion Section during his tenure.

New Jersey Transit bus route #2 travels along County Avenue from  Secaucus Junction to Journal Square.

Gallery

See also
Crescent Corridor
List of rail yards
New Jersey Meadowlands Commission
Hudson Generating Station
List of neighborhoods in Jersey City, New Jersey
Tonnele Circle
Marion Junction
Northeast Corridor
Pulaski Skyway
U.S. Route 1/9
Wittpenn Bridge
Main Line
Bergen County Line
Pascack Valley Line
Passaic and Harsimus Line
West Hudson
Wittpenn Bridge

References

Neighborhoods in Jersey City, New Jersey
New Jersey Meadowlands District
Rail yards in New Jersey
Transportation in Hudson County, New Jersey
Lorillard Tobacco Company